The M-77 Oganj (Serbian for Fire) is a 128mm self-propelled multiple rocket launcher developed in the former Yugoslavia. NATO designation is the YMRL-32.

Development
Development started in 1968. Professor Obrad Vučurović, mechanical Engineer and Chief Operating Officer of the Artillery department of Military Technical Institute, developed and managed construction and production of the M-77 Oganj.

The 6 pre-serial production version, based on a FAP 2220 6x6 truck, was shown to the public for the first time in 1975. Serial production started two years later. The M-77 is mounted on FAP 2026 BDS/A 6x6 truck bed. The rocket system is placed on the back of the platform with 32 128mm launch tubes capable of reaching targets 20,600 metres away. The crew consists of five men. In 1994 Serbia developed new version called Oganj C with designation M-94. Oganj C (M-94) could fire two type of rockets M91 (cluster-type warhead with 40 submunition grenades) and M77 (HE warhead). Other feature was design that it is caring reload rocket pack of 32 additional rockets that allows the launcher to be reloaded within 3 minutes for second salvo.

Unique features
One of unique features of Oganj M-77 is the movable canvas that allows the vehicle to be easy masked, and become very hard to be spotted by the enemy until it is in combat position and ready to fire. In that way it can be used to mislead enemy and is an effective way of military deception. Originally invented in 1977 by Military Technical Institute, multiple rocket system is an indigenously designed and built system equipped with an automatic operating and laying system, an electric firing system and an automatically reloadable pack .The system saw later use in China in the Type 90A Type 90B and PR50 MLRS.

Modernization
Military Technical Institute on demand from Serbian Armed Forces has produced modernization program for Oganj M-77. Include modern navigation and fire control system. Oganj to use many different rockets including  Grad 122mm and Oganj 128mm. As part of modernization new rocket 128mm with range of 50 km and better CEP will be produced by Krušik. For the needs of the Serbian Army, the process of modernization of the existing Oganj M-77 weapons has begun in order to switch to modern digitalized technology, which enables the tool service to occupy a firing position, act and leave it in 3 minutes without getting out of the vehicle. It used to take 26 minutes to occupy a firing position. At that time, it included occupying the orientation position and determining the coordinates of the firing position, directing the weapon in the azimuth of the basic direction, calculating the initial elements, correction and group shooting. After modernization, thanks to the new automatic aiming line, automatic determination of the coordinates of the firing position and shooting elements, as well as the new inertial navigation system and GPRS navigation. Fire tasks on the modernized M-77 Oganj are performed much faster, more precisely and with a greater effect on the target. New M-18 missiles with a range of up to 40 km were also introduced. A new rocket with path correction has also been developed, with a range of up to 50 km. This modernization is already being serially performed for the needs of the Serbian army. 

Further development of M-77 concept and LRSVM Morava has given new modular launcher Oganj LRSVM M18 - with armored cabin on 6x6 chassis for close battlefront action and possibilities to launch Košava 1 and ALAS among other missiles.

Operators

Current operators
 - 20
 - 12 (uses 122mm rockets)
 - 60

Former operators

See also

Related development
 M-63 Plamen
 M-87 Orkan

Comparable systems
BM-21 Grad
LAROM
RM-70
WR-40 Langusta

Compatible with
LRSVM Morava - newly developed MLRS for Serbian Army as well as exports; planned replacement of M-77 Oganj and M-63 Plamen

References

128 mm artillery
Self-propelled artillery of Serbia
Multiple rocket launchers of Yugoslavia
Modular rocket launchers
Military vehicles introduced in the 1970s